Gruev Cove is the 300 m wide cove indenting for 650 m the east coast of Greenwich Island, in the South Shetland Islands south of Santa Cruz Point and north of Parchevich Ridge.  It is surmounted by Bogdan Ridge to the north and Benkovski Nunatak to the west. The cove was formed as a result of glacier retreat in the second half of 20th century.

The cove is named "after Dame Gruev (1871–1906), a leader of the Bulgarian liberation movement in Macedonia".

Location
British mapping in 1968.

Maps
 L.L. Ivanov et al. Antarctica: Livingston Island and Greenwich Island, South Shetland Islands. Scale 1:100000 topographic map. Sofia: Antarctic Place-names.
 L.L. Ivanov. Antarctica: Livingston Island and Greenwich, Robert, Snow and Smith Islands. Scale 1:120000 topographic map.  Troyan: Manfred Wörner Foundation, 2009.

Notes

References
 Bulgarian Antarctic Gazetteer. Antarctic Place-names Commission. (details in Bulgarian, basic data in English)

External links
 Gruev Cove. Copernix satellite image

Coves of Greenwich Island